The 21st South American Youth Championships in Athletics were held at the Parque San Martín in Mendoza, Argentina between October 26–28, 2012.  A detailed discussion of the results was given elsewhere.

Medal summary
Complete results can be found on the CONSUDATLE website.  Detailed result lists can also be found on the "World Junior Athletics History" website.

Men

Women

Medal table (unofficial)

Team trophies
The placing tables for team trophy (overall team, men and women categories) were published.

Total

Male

Female

Participation (unofficial)
Different numbers were published.  One source announces 317 athletes from 11
countries including 1 athlete from Costa Rica invited as guest nation.   Working through the results, an unofficial count yields the number of about 308 athletes (including 1 athlete from Costa Rica as guest) in the start list.  Following, the numbers in brackets refer to (athletes in published team roster/athletes in start list):

 (65/61)
 (9)
 (69)
 (60/59)
 (21)
 Panamá (7)
 (5)
 Perú (29)
 (31/27)
 (20)
 (1) Guest nation

References

External links
 (in Spanish)
World Junior Athletics History

South American U18 Championships in Athletics
South American Youth Championships in Athletics
South American U18
International athletics competitions hosted by Argentina
Youth Championships in Athletics
South American Youth Championships in Athletics
Youth Championships in Athletics